This is an article about Mike Duvall, the major league baseball pitcher. For the former California State Assemblyman, see Michael D. Duvall

Michael Alan Duvall (born October 11, 1974) is an American former professional baseball pitcher. He was drafted by the Florida Marlins in the 19th round of the 1995 Major League Baseball Draft, and pitched parts of four seasons in the Major League Baseball (MLB) for the Tampa Bay Devil Rays and Minnesota Twins.

External links 
, or Retrosheet, or Pelota Binaria

1974 births
Living people
American expatriate baseball players in Canada
Baseball players from Virginia
Brevard County Manatees players
Durham Bulls players
Edmonton Trappers players
Gulf Coast Marlins players
Kane County Cougars players
Major League Baseball pitchers
Minnesota Twins players
Pastora de los Llanos players
American expatriate baseball players in Venezuela
People from Warrenton, Virginia
Portland Sea Dogs players
Potomac State Catamounts baseball players
Rochester Red Wings players
St. Petersburg Devil Rays players
Tampa Bay Devil Rays players